Kevin Jesús Kelsy Genez (born 27 July 2004) is a Venezuelan footballer who plays as a forward for Shakhtar Donetsk and the Venezuela U20 football team.

Club career
Having broken into the first team at Mineros in 2021, he went on to establish himself in the 2022 season, scoring his first goals for the club.

On 31 January 2023, Shakhtar Donetsk announced the signing of Kelsy from Boston River on a contract until the end of December 2027. He signed with the Ukrainian club during a Russian invasion of Ukraine.

On 23 February 2023 Kelsy was a substitute during a Europa League Playoff 2nd Leg against Rennes. In the penalty shootout he scored the deciding goal that made Shakhtar Donetsk move on to the Round of 16.

Career statistics

Club

Notes

References

2004 births
Living people
Sportspeople from Valencia, Venezuela
Venezuelan footballers
Venezuela youth international footballers
Association football forwards
A.C.C.D. Mineros de Guayana players
Boston River players
FC Shakhtar Donetsk players
Venezuelan Primera División players
Ukrainian Premier League players
Venezuelan expatriate footballers
Expatriate footballers in Uruguay
Expatriate footballers in Ukraine
Venezuelan expatriate sportspeople in Uruguay
Venezuelan expatriate sportspeople in Ukraine
21st-century Venezuelan people